Santo Yukio Condorelli (born January 17, 1995) is an Italian competitive swimmer who previously competed for Canada. He competed at the 2020 Summer Olympics, in Men's 4 × 100 metre freestyle relay, winning a silver medal.

Personal life 
Santo Condorelli was born in Kitahiroshima, Hokkaido, Japan, on January 17, 1995, to parents Joseph and Tonya Condorelli. Condorelli was raised in the Portland, Oregon, suburb of Lake Oswego and began swimming when he was 5 years old with the encouragement of his father. He was able to compete for the Canadian team because his mother was born and raised in Kenora, Ontario., and for Italy because of his father.

Swimming 
Condorelli competed in the 2012 U.S. Olympic Trials, and the 2014 Phillips 66 Summer National Championships while representing the United States. At the 2013 American Junior National Swimming Championships, he set an American National Age Group Record for the 17-18 age group in the 100 m Freestyle. Starting in 2015, he began to represent Canada, and received a bronze medal at the 2015 World Aquatics Championships for the 4 × 100 m Mixed Freestyle Relay alongside Yuri Kisil, Chantal van Landeghem, and Sandrine Mainville, and finished 4th at the 100m freestyle event, missing the podium by 0.07 seconds. He also received two individual and two relay medals at the 2015 Pan American Games.

Condorelli swam collegiately for the University of Southern California from 2013-2018, utilizing a redshirt for the 2015 season leading up to the 2016 Summer Olympics.

In 2016, he was named to Canada's Olympic team for the 2016 Summer Olympics. He finished 4th in the 100 m freestyle in a time of 47.88, missing a bronze medal by 0.03 seconds.

Rituals 
Prior to his swims, Condorelli gives the finger to his father, who returns the gesture back to him, as a way to boost confidence and relieve stress.

References

External links

Biography at swimming.ca

Living people
1995 births
Sportspeople from Hokkaido
Swimmers from Portland, Oregon
Italian male freestyle swimmers
Italian male butterfly swimmers
Canadian male freestyle swimmers
Canadian male butterfly swimmers
American male freestyle swimmers
American male butterfly swimmers
Canadian people of Italian descent
Italian people of Canadian descent
American people of Italian descent
American people of Canadian descent
Swimmers at the 2015 Pan American Games
World Aquatics Championships medalists in swimming
Pan American Games silver medalists for Canada
Pan American Games bronze medalists for Canada
Olympic swimmers of Italy
Olympic swimmers of Canada
Swimmers at the 2016 Summer Olympics
Bolles School alumni
USC Trojans men's swimmers
Pan American Games medalists in swimming
Medalists at the 2015 Pan American Games
Swimmers at the 2020 Summer Olympics
Medalists at the 2020 Summer Olympics
Olympic silver medalists in swimming
Olympic silver medalists for Italy